Maciej Filipowicz (born 17 August 1998) is a Polish professional footballer who plays as a midfielder for Orlęta Radzyń Podlaski.

Club career
On 22 October 2020, he joined Orlęta Radzyń Podlaski in the fourth-tier III liga.

References

External links
 
 

1998 births
People from Radom
Sportspeople from Masovian Voivodeship
Living people
Polish footballers
Association football midfielders
Radomiak Radom players
II liga players
III liga players